The Sigma 8mm f/4 EX DG is a photographic lens made by the Sigma Corporation. It is a circular fisheye lens for full-frame cameras, and has been replaced by the Sigma 8mm 3.5 EX DG.

External links 
 Sigma 8mm f/4 EX DG official page

008mm f/4 EX DG
Fisheye lenses